, better known by her stage name Kaho, is a Japanese actress and fashion model. Kaho has won multiple Japanese entertainment industry awards, including a Hochi Film Award, a Nikkan Sports Film Award, and a Japan Academy Prize.

Career

Kaho was scouted in Omotesandō while still an elementary school student, and she began her career as a model for Japanese teen magazines.
From 2004 to 2007, Kaho was the 11th Mitsui ReHouse Girl.

In 2007 Kaho won her first major acting prize, a Hochi Film Award in the Best New Artist category. In 2008 she won a Nikkan Sports Film Award for Best Newcomer, received a Best New Talent award at the 2008 Yokohama Film Festival for her performance in the film A Gentle Breeze in the Village, and was recognized as one of the Newcomers of the Year at the 31st Japan Academy Prize ceremony. Kaho played numerous TV and film roles throughout her teen years, but Mark Schilling of The Japan Times noted that she was often typecast as a "wide-eyed, pure-hearted innocent."

In 2016 Kaho was nominated for a 39th Japan Academy Prize in the Best Supporting Actress category for her performance in 海街diary (Our Little Sister), but did not win. In 2017 she played the role of K in the Sono Sion-directed Amazon Video drama Tokyo Vampire Hotel.

Filmography

Film

TV dramas

Advertising
 Asahi Breweries "Asahi Cocktail Partner: Colorful Time" national TV commercial, 2012
 Shiseido "Integrate" campaign, 2016

Awards

References

External links 

 Kaho (actress) Official profile

Japanese female models
Actresses from Tokyo
1991 births
Living people
Stardust Promotion artists
21st-century Japanese actresses